Love Today is a 1997 Indian Tamil-language romantic drama film written and directed by Balasekaran, who made his debut with the venture. This film stars Vijay, Suvalakshmi and Manthra while Raghuvaran, Karan and Sriman all play other supporting roles. The film received positive reviews from critics and was very successful at the box office. The film ran for over 175 days. It was remade in Telugu as Suswagatham, in Kannada as Majnu, and in Hindi as Kya Yehi Pyaar Hai.

Plot 
Ganesh is a college graduate who lives with his father Chandrasekhar, a doctor. Chandrasekhar is easygoing and pampers Ganesh with whatever he wants. Sandhya is the daughter of a very strict police inspector Vasudevan, who is always suspicious that she would have a love affair. Sandhya makes up her mind that she would never fall in love, and her ambition is to get a gold medal in her college degree. One day, Ganesh spots Sandhya and falls in love with her at first sight. Even though Sandhya catches a good glimpse of him, she tells her friend Fathima that she likes no one. Ganesh goes to the bus stop everyday to see Sandhya. He tries to get advice from his friends Ravi and Peter to convince Sandhya to marry him. Their advice goes in vain as she does not care about him. She confronts Ganesh one day and tells him not to waste his time on her.

Ganesh gets hold of Sandhya's friend Preethi, and she tries to talk to Sandhya, but she is unmovable. Vasudevan becomes suspicious of Ganesh and Sandhya and uses physical force on Ganesh. He also verbally abuses Sandhya, though she tries to explain her innocence. Sandhya is forced to leave town because of this. Ganesh finds her whereabouts and leaves his father to go out of town and find her. As he is trying to find her, Chandrasekhar has an accident and passes away. His friends desperately try to find his whereabouts but cannot trace him. Peter ends up performing Chandrasekhar's last rites. Ganesh arrives and gets heartbroken that he could not even perform his father's cremation.

At this point, Sandhya reveals her feelings for Ganesh, tells him that she loves him, and says she wants to spend the rest of her life with him. However, he rejects her feelings and tells her he had lost everything because of falling in love and that he couldn't even do his father's last rites, therefore she is not worth it. Nevertheless, the following day, Sandhya is seen standing at the bus stop, waiting for Ganesh to come. Meanwhile, Ganesh takes the recommendation that his father had written for him before his death and goes for his first interview.

Cast

Production 
In an interview during the release, Vijay mentioned that he signed the film to give the audience what they want — fights, fast songs and a message, mentioning he had similar success from Poove Unakkaga (1996).

Soundtrack 
The soundtrack is composed by newcomer Shiva. His real name was Omar and he earlier composed an album. The lyrics were written by Vairamuthu, Vaasan, Vaigarai Selvan, 'Pattukottai' Shanmuga Sundaram. The song "Enna Azhagu" was reused by Shiva in the 2001 Telugu film Priyamaina Neeku as "Nelanadiga Puvvulanadiga" also produced by R. B. Choudary and directed by Balasekaran.

Reception 
Ananda Vikatan rated the film 42 out of 100. Prabha and Pady Srinivasan of Indolink.com appreciated the film due to "its different ending", and said Vijay and Suvalakshmi both sparkle in their respective roles. The film became one of several successful films in the romantic genre with Vijay featured in throughout the late 1990s. The success of the film prompted the director and actor to come together again immediately for a film titled Priyamudan, however the title was later used by Vijay for a different project.

Remakes

References

External links 
 

1990s Tamil-language films
1997 films
1997 romantic drama films
Films directed by Balasekaran
Indian romantic drama films
Tamil films remade in other languages
Super Good Films films